Clifton, California may refer to:
Clifton, former name of Del Rey, California
Clifton, former name of Last Chance, California